Johann Philipp d'Arco, Count of Arco (11 May 1652 – 18 February 1704) was a soldier who served  the Habsburg monarchy for 30 years. Because he surrendered the fortress of Breisach after only 13 days, he was sentenced to death and executed. A different general named Arco, Jean Baptist, Comte d'Arco was employed by the Electorate of Bavaria, Austria's enemy in the War of the Spanish Succession.

Career
D'Arco was born in Arco, Trentino, and already had 30 years distinguished service when he was ordered by Louis William, Margrave of Baden-Baden in 1703 to defend Breisach to the last man against a French attack under Claude Louis Hector de Villars.

The city was well defended and d'Arco disposed of sufficient soldiers to hold the city for a considerable time; but he capitulated on 6 September 1703 after only 13 days of siege. The "key" to southern Germany fell into enemy hands together with many supplies, guns and ammunition.

D'Arco was charged with treason and beheaded on 18 February 1704, at Bregenz. His second in command Luigi Ferdinando Marsigli was stripped of all honours and his sword was broken over him.

References 
 Alessandro Cont, Biblioteca comunale di Trento. Collezione Segala (Archivio della famiglia dei conti d'Arco). Schedatura del fondo (1388–1886), Trento, Provincia autonoma di Trento. Soprintendenza per i Beni librari archivistici e archeologici, 2010.

Sources 
Wikisource; Allgemeine Deutsche Biographie

1652 births
1704 deaths
Austrian army commanders in the War of the Spanish Succession
Johann Philipp
Executed Austrian people
People from Trentino
Generals of the Holy Roman Empire